Mucilaginibacter flavus is a bacterium from the genus of Mucilaginibacter which has been isolated from wetland from the Jeju Island in Korea.

References

Sphingobacteriia
Bacteria described in 2014